Big Love, an American drama television series created by Mark V. Olsen and Will Scheffer, premiered on HBO on March 12, 2006. The series revolves around Bill Henrickson (Bill Paxton), a polygamist living in Sandy, Utah with his three wives, Barb (Jeanne Tripplehorn), Nicki (Chloë Sevigny) and Margene (Ginnifer Goodwin) and their children. Bill struggles to maintain a happy family life whilst keeping their illegal lifestyle a secret.

Series overview

Episodes

Season 1 (2006)

Season 2 (2007)

Season 3 (2009)

Season 4 (2010)

Season 5 (2011)

Webisodes: "In the Beginning" 
Prior to Season 2, HBO aired a series of three Webisodes collectively entitled "Big Love: In The Beginning" which explored how the Henricksons came to be a family.  These three short films were also included on the Season 2 DVD release.

References

External links 
 
 HBO.com episode guide
 TV.com episode guide
 Episodeworld.com episode guide

Big Love
Episodes